The Party for Justice and Development (PAJUDE) is a political party in Burundi.

Political parties in Burundi